Penguin Peak is a  mountain summit located in the Chugach Mountains, in Anchorage Municipality in the U.S. state of Alaska. The peak is the dominant feature along the north shore of Turnagain Arm when traveling the Seward Highway, and the summit offers a good view of Mount Alpenglow,  directly across Turnagain Arm to the south.

Climate

Based on the Köppen climate classification,  Penguin Peak is located in a subarctic climate zone with cold, snowy winters, and mild summers. Weather systems coming off the Gulf of Alaska are forced upwards by the Chugach Mountains (orographic lift), causing heavy precipitation in the form of rainfall and snowfall. Temperatures can drop below −20 °C with wind chill factors below −30 °C. Precipitation runoff from the mountain drains into Penguin Creek and Turnagain Arm.

See also

List of mountain peaks of Alaska
Geology of Alaska

References

Gallery

External links
 Penguin Peak flyover video

Mountains of Alaska
Mountains of Anchorage, Alaska
North American 1000 m summits